William Henry Kelson FRCS FZS (15 August 1862 – 24 January 1940) was an English physician and writer, President of the Hunterian Society, Fellow of the Royal College of Surgeons and of the Zoological Society of London.

Early life
Kelson was born in London.  He was educated at Gresham's School, Holt, and from 1880 at the London Hospital (now the Royal London Hospital, where he held the Letheby scholarship.

Career
After qualifying as a surgeon, Kelson held various hospital appointments. He was surgeon to the throat and ear department of the City Dispensary, became President of the Laryngological Section and Honorary Secretary to the Otological and Laryngological Sections of the Royal Society of Medicine and President of the Hunterian Society.

Publications
Handbook of Diseases of Throat, Nose and Ear
Essays on Laryngeal Diseases in Children
Diseases of Upper Respiratory Tract in Relation to Life Assurance

Family
In 1921, Kelson married Hilda Frances, younger daughter of Arthur W. Lane, of Ealing, but they had no children. He was the only son or William Henry Kelson Snr and Ann Maria Perry. He had two sisters, Emily and Wilhelmina. He was the grandson of Colonel Charles Kelson and great-grandson of Dr Thomas Mortimer Kelson of Sevenoaks in Kent.

References
'KELSON, William Henry', in Who Was Who, A & C Black, 1920–2007; online edition by Oxford University Press, December 2007 (subscription required) KELSON, William Henry, accessed 23 August 2008

1862 births
1940 deaths
Fellows of the Royal College of Surgeons
Fellows of the Zoological Society of London
People educated at Gresham's School
People from Holt, Norfolk
English non-fiction writers
19th-century English medical doctors
20th-century English medical doctors
English male non-fiction writers
19th-century English male writers